Peacemeal is an album by American jazz saxophonist Lee Konitz's Quintet recorded in 1969 and released on the Milestone label. The 2004 CD reissue added three alternate takes as bonus tracks not on the original LP.

Critical reception

Scott Yanow of Allmusic called it "A thought-provoking and consistently enjoyable set of music".

Track listing 
 "Thumb Under (No. 98 from Mikrokosmos)" (Béla Bartók) – 3:11  
 "Lester Leaps In" (Lester Young) – 3:22  
 "Village Joke (No. 130 from Mikrokosmos)" (Bartók) – 4:05  
 "Something to Sing" (Dick Katz) – 4:09  
 "Peacemeal" (Katz) – 7:05  
 "Body and Soul" (Johnny Green, Edward Heyman, Frank Eyton, Robert Sour) – 5:04
 "Peasant Dance (No. 128 From Mikrokosmos)" (Bartók) – 4:56  
 "Fourth Dimension" (Lee Konitz) – 4:34  
 "Second Thoughts" (Katz) – 3:06  
 "Subconscious-Lee" (Konitz) – 4:13  
 "Lester Leaps In" [Take 4] (Young) – 3:18 Bonus track on CD reissue  
 "Body and Soul" [Take 3] (Green, Heyman, Eyton, Sour) – 6:30 Bonus track on CD reissue  
 "Subconscious-Lee" [Take 6] (Konitz) – 5:51 Bonus track on CD reissue

Personnel 
Lee Konitz – alto saxophone, tenor saxophone, multivider
Marshall Brown – valve trombone, baritone horn
Dick Katz – piano, electric piano
Eddie Gómez – bass
Jack DeJohnette – drums

References 

Lee Konitz albums
1970 albums
Milestone Records albums